Cessenon-sur-Orb (literally Cessenon on Orb) is a commune in the Hérault department in southern France.

Population

See also
Communes of the Hérault department

References

External links 

 Official website

Communes of Hérault